Monterey Regional Airport  is three miles (5 km) southeast of Monterey, in Monterey County, California, United States. It was created in 1936 and was known as the Monterey Peninsula Airport until the board of directors renamed it on September 14, 2011.

The airport is owned by the municipalities that make up the Monterey Peninsula Airport District. It is a public entity and its five-member board of directors is publicly elected.

The airport has its origins with flights from the polo field of the Hotel Del Monte in 1910. In 1941, local communities formed the Monterey Peninsula Airport District and acquired land to build an airport. World War II intervened, and the U.S. Navy leased the land, opening Naval Auxiliary Air Station Monterey on May 23, 1943. The Navy remained at the airport until 1972.

Runways

 10R/28L:  asphalt
 10L/28R:  asphalt

Airlines and destinations

Passenger

Allegiant Air is the only airline serving Monterey with mainline jets such as the Airbus A319 that flies nonstop to Las Vegas. Allegiant planned to fly Boeing 757-200s nonstop to Honolulu starting in November, 2012; however, this Hawaii service never started and was subsequently permanently cancelled. Avelo Airlines also planned Boeing 737-800 service to Burbank beginning in September 2021, however this service was also cancelled temporarily before it launched.

Statistics

Top destinations

Historical airline service

In 1933 Pacific Seaboard Air Lines scheduled passenger flights on single engine Bellanca CH-300s, two daily round trips Los Angeles - Santa Barbara - Santa Maria - San Luis Obispo - Paso Robles - Monterey - Salinas - San Jose - San Francisco. Pacific Seaboard later moved its operation to the eastern U.S., was renamed Chicago and Southern Air Lines, and become a domestic and international airline that in 1953 was acquired by and merged into Delta Air Lines.

Past jet service

 United Airlines mainline flights served Monterey from the 1930s until 2001. In 1966 United Convair 340s flew nonstop to San Francisco (SFO) and direct to Los Angeles (LAX) via Santa Barbara. In 1969 all United flights at Monterey were operated with Boeing 727-100s and Boeing 737-200s nonstop to Los Angeles and San Francisco.  United later operated Douglas DC-8s, Boeing 727-200s, 757-200s and Airbus A320s to Monterey; the United DC-8 and 757 were the largest passenger aircraft ever scheduled to MRY. In 1979-81 United B727-100s flew nonstop to Chicago and Denver. In 1942 United Douglas DC-3s flew to Los Angeles, San Francisco and Santa Barbara.
 Pacific Air Lines:  Boeing 727-100s. Pacific operated the first jets from Monterey in 1966, nonstop 727s to San Francisco and direct 727s to Los Angeles via Santa Barbara. The longest runway was then 5000 feet. 
 Hughes Airwest (formerly Air West):  Douglas DC-9-10s and McDonnell Douglas DC-9-30s. In 1968 predecessor Air West Boeing 727-100s (formerly flown by Pacific Air Lines) flew nonstop to Los Angeles and direct to Las Vegas.
 Air California (predecessor of AirCal): Boeing 737-200s
 Pacific Express: BAC One-Elevens
 Pacific Southwest Airlines: Boeing 727-100s in the late 1970s followed by BAe 146-200s in the late 1980s
 USAir (predecessor of US Airways): BAe 146-200s (formerly operated by Pacific Southwest Airlines)
 WestAir (operating as United Express): BAe 146-200s
 America West Express (operated by Mesa Airlines): Canadair CRJ200s
 ExpressJet (operating independently): Embraer ERJ-145s

Before starting 727 service, Pacific Air Lines served Monterey with Martin 4-0-4s followed by Fairchild F-27s. Predecessor Southwest Airways began serving Monterey in the late 1940s with Douglas DC-3s. Pacific Air Lines merged with Bonanza Air Lines and West Coast Airlines in 1968 to form Air West which was renamed Hughes Airwest in 1970 after its acquisition by Howard Hughes.

Golden Gate Airlines

Golden Gate Airlines was based in Monterey and served over 20 cities, primarily in California and also in Colorado, Idaho, Nevada and Utah. This regional air carrier operated a fleet of turboprop aircraft including Convair 580s, Fairchild Swearingen Metroliners, Fokker F27s, de Havilland Canada DHC-7 Dash 7s and Aerospatiale N 262s (Nord 262); their March 1, 1980 timetable claims over a thousand flights were being operated weekly.  The airline ceased operations circa 1981 after an unsuccessful merger with Swift Aire Lines which was based in San Luis Obispo, CA. In 1980-81 Golden Gate flew nonstop from Monterey to Fresno, Los Angeles, Sacramento, San Francisco, San Jose, Santa Barbara and Reno.

Regional and commuter airline service

Several other regional and commuter air carriers served Monterey in the 1980s and 1990s, primarily to Los Angeles and/or San Francisco. These included Apollo Airways and successor Pacific Coast Airlines, Mid Pacific Air operating as Reno Air Express (to San Jose), Sierra Expressway (to Oakland), SkyWest Airlines initially operating as Delta Connection and later as United Express, StatesWest Airlines operating as USAir Express, WestAir Commuter Airlines initially operating independently and later as United Express, and Wings West initially operating independently and later as American Eagle Airlines. Turboprops operated by these carriers included the Beechcraft 99, Beechcraft 1900C, BAe Jetstream 31, de Havilland Canada DHC-6 Twin Otter, Embraer EMB-120 Brasilia, Fairchild Swearingen Metroliner, Handley Page Jetstream, Saab 340, Short 330 and Short 360.

Mesa Airlines and SkyWest both operating as American Eagle and SkyWest also operating as United Express continue to serve Monterey with regional jet flights. Mesa Air operates Canadair CRJ-900s and SkyWest operates Canadair CRJ-200s and CRJ-700s.  Horizon Air operating on behalf of Alaska Airlines serves the airport with Bombardier Q400s, the largest and fastest member of the de Havilland Canada DHC-8 Dash 8 family.

Ground transportation
The airport is located along Olmstead Road just north of Highway 68 (Salinas Hwy). Highway 1 can be reached to the northwest via Highway 68. The airport provides both short-term and long-term parking facilities. Also, a premium parking lot is located directly in front of the terminal.

Monterey–Salinas Transit is the public ground transit organization that serves the airport. Taxi services for the airport are regulated by the Monterey County Regional Taxi Authority. The ridesharing services Lyft and Uber are also permitted to operate at the airport.

Accidents and incidents
On June 14, 1964 at about 7:35 pm a Piper PA-28 (tail number N5384W) hit trees in Monterey, killing the 34-year-old student pilot. The investigation into the fatal accident revealed that the pilot misjudged his altitude, flying too low and under the influence of alcohol. The crash also caused the Piper to catch fire.

On August 17, 1968 at about 12:36 pm, a Cessna 210 (tail number N9676T) stalled while landing at the Monterey Peninsula Airport. During the landing, the 48-year-old pilot suffered a heart attack, which caused his Cessna to stall. The Cessna was destroyed upon impact. The pilot had about 5,743 flight hours of experience.

On July 26, 1979 at about 9:43 pm a Cessna 320A (tail number N3005R) crashed during its final approach to Monterey. The 62-year-old pilot used improper Instrument Flight Rules operations. The pilot had about 3,621 flight hours.

On August 23, 1984 at about 8:51 pm a Cessna 320C (tail number N7AE) departed from Monterey under Special Visual Flight Rules with a 58-year-old pilot and four passengers. At about 8:55 pm Air Traffic Control advised N7AE to turn left to avoid rising terrain. The Cessna was unable to avoid the terrain, crashed, and caught fire; all aboard died. The investigation revealed that the pilot made poor decisions and did not follow instructions from Air Traffic Control. The pilot had about 2,041 hours of flight experience.

On July 27, 1985 a Piper PA-28-235 (tail number N15548) took off from Monterey to practice holding patterns over Monterey Bay. About 12 minutes into the flight, the 60-year-old pilot radioed Air Traffic Control, "Mayday, rough engine." The Piper disappeared from Air Traffic Control's radar at about 1300 feet. Later the United States Coast Guard discovered pieces of the Piper in the ocean. The investigation revealed that the pilot used improper procedures. The pilot had about 1,923 hours of flight experience.

On July 24, 1987 a Piper PA-32R-301T (tail number N82793) was cleared for an Instrument Landing System approach when the 39-year-old pilot decided to conduct a go around procedure. About 30 seconds after initiating the procedure, the pilot radioed Air Traffic Control, "Seven niner three, in trouble." Sixteen seconds later another transmission is broadcast, "I have, I have an emergency back here." The Piper was seen making a 400-foot descent below assigned altitude and disappeared into Monterey Bay. A boater reported seeing the Piper "dive out" of a cloud and crash into the water. The investigation revealed that the pilot experienced spatial disorientation and lacked instrument flying time. The pilot had about 528 hours of flight experience.

On September 8, 1987 at about 5:50 pm, a Beechcraft 95 (tail number N845B), being flown by a 31-year-old student pilot, was conducting multi-engine training at Monterey. The pilot started practicing Instrument Landing System approaches. During an approach for a landing, the Beechcraft crashed into the ground. The investigation revealed that there was inadequate supervision during the training exercise. The pilot and student pilot were killed.

On June 24, 1992 a Cessna 421B (tail number N628RJ), the 40-year-old pilot and two passengers took off from Monterey. About three minutes after takeoff the Cessna collided with a hill about three miles east of the airport. The investigation revealed that ground fog and overconfidence in the pilot caused the accident. All three were killed. The pilot had about 75 hours of flight experience.

On August 7, 1997 at about 8:00 pm a Grumman American AA-5 (tail number N6086L) took off from Monterey. The Grumman was later found 18 miles south of the airport. It had crashed into the mountains which caused the Grumman to catch fire. The 31-year-old pilot had about 4,000 hours of flight experience.

On October 12, 1997 at about 5:28 pm a Rutan Long-EZ (tail number N555JD) being flown by musician and performer John Denver crashed into Monterey Bay near Pacific Grove. After taking off from Monterey the Long-EZ started its climb then descended into the bay. The investigation revealed that the collision was caused by the fuel valve selector being in an improper position. Inadequate flight planning also contributed to the collision. John Denver had about 2,750 hours of flight experience and was fatally injured in this accident.

On July 13, 2021, at around 10:42 am,  a Cessna 421C (tail number N678SW), piloted by Mary Ellen Carlin crashed into a suburban residential area killing the pilot, passenger and a pet. Investigators found that the Cessna 421C diverged from its flight plan, resulting in a crash less than five minutes after departure.

References

External links
 Monterey Regional Airport (MRY): Airport terminal map
 
 Monterey Regional Airport (official site)
 

Airports in Monterey County, California
Airports established in 1936
Buildings and structures in Monterey, California
Closed installations of the United States Navy